Mortimer Melville Jackson (March 5, 1809October 13, 1889) was an American lawyer, judge, and diplomat.  He was a justice of the original Wisconsin Supreme Court from 1848 through 1853 and was later a United States consul general in Canada for twenty years.  Prior to Wisconsin statehood, he was Attorney General of the Wisconsin Territory.

Biography
Born in Rensselaerville, New York, Jackson was educated in New York City, where he studied law and was admitted to the bar. In 1838, Jackson moved to Milwaukee, and then in 1839 to Mineral Point, Wisconsin Territory, where he practiced law, involving the lead-mining industry.

In 1842, Wisconsin Territorial Governor James Duane Doty appointed Jackson Attorney General of the Wisconsin Territory, where he served until 1846. When Wisconsin became a state, in 1848, Jackson was elected one of the first five Wisconsin Circuit Court judges.  At the time, the Wisconsin Supreme Court was constituted of the five circuit court judges, thus Jackson was also a justice of the Wisconsin Supreme Court until a separate Supreme Court was formed in 1853.

Politically, Judge Jackson was involved with the Whig Party from as early as 1834, and joined the Republican Party when it was formed in the 1850s.  In 1857 he was a candidate for United States Senate, but was defeated by James Rood Doolittle.  In 1861, President Abraham Lincoln appointed Jackson United States consul general in Halifax, Canada.  As consul general, he was instrumental in the seizure of about $3,000,000 worth of Confederate property during the American Civil War (about $49,000,000 in inflation-adjusted dollars). He would remain in this role for 21 years until his retirement in 1882. He then returned to Madison, Wisconsin, where he died seven years later at the Park Hotel.

Legacy
Jackson's will donated $20,000 to the Law School at the University of Wisconsin to create the Mortimer M. Jackson Professorship of Law.

Electoral history

Wisconsin Attorney General (1857)

| colspan="6" style="text-align:center;background-color: #e9e9e9;"| General Election, November 3, 1857

References

External links
 

|-

|-

|-

|-

|-

People from Rensselaerville, New York
People from Mineral Point, Wisconsin
Politicians from Madison, Wisconsin
New York (state) lawyers
Wisconsin lawyers
New York (state) Whigs
19th-century American politicians
Wisconsin Whigs
19th-century American diplomats
Wisconsin state court judges
Justices of the Wisconsin Supreme Court
Wisconsin Attorneys General
1809 births
1889 deaths
American consuls
Lawyers from Madison, Wisconsin
19th-century American judges
19th-century American lawyers